The 1998 IIHF InLine Hockey World Championship was the third IIHF InLine Hockey World Championship, the premier annual international inline hockey tournament. It took place at Anaheim, California, United States, with the gold-medal game played July 25, 1998, at the Arrowhead Pond.

Group A

Preliminary round
Scores

Group A standings

Group B standings

Playoff round

Semifinals

Gold medal game

Bronze medal game

Consolation round

5th place game

7th place game

Group B
The Group B tournament was played in Bratislava and Trnava, Slovakia, from July 14–19, 1998.

Preliminary round
Group A standings

Group B standings

Playoff round

Semifinals

Gold medal game

Bronze medal game

Consolation round

5th place game

7th place game

References

IIHF InLine Hockey World Championship
1998 in inline hockey
1998 in American sports
1998 in sports in California
Inline hockey in the United States
International sports competitions hosted by the United States